The girls' 100 metres hurdles event at the 2010 Youth Olympic Games was held on 17–21 August 2010 in Bishan Stadium.

Schedule

Results

Heats

Finals

Final C

Final B

Final A

External links
 iaaf.org - Women's 100m hurdles
 

Athletics at the 2010 Summer Youth Olympics